Christian Kanyengele (born 15 November 1976) is a former a Congolese football player.

Career
Born in Kisangani, Zaire, Kanyengele spent his youth in the capital Kinshasa and played football for a local amateur side. His club participated in a friendly tournament in Vicenza, Italy, and shortly after he returned to Italy to look for a club at age 18. After working odd jobs for six months, he was eventually signed by Serie D club A.S. Terracina.

Kanyengele spent three seasons with Terracina, but due to restrictions on clubs signing foreign players in Serie C, he had a difficult time finding a new club.

In 1999, Kanyengele joined Serie B side Calcio Savoia, playing two seasons with the club. He moved on to Calcio Catania in Serie C1, eventually appearing for the club in Serie B and going on loan to S.S. Sambenedettese Calcio twice.

Kanyengele made several appearances for the senior Congo DR national football team, including appearing in the 2000 African Nations Cup qualifying rounds. He scored two goals in a home Nations Cup qualifier against Kenya in January 1999.

References

External links

Profile at Lega Calcio

1976 births
Living people
People from Kisangani
Democratic Republic of the Congo footballers
Democratic Republic of the Congo expatriate footballers
Democratic Republic of the Congo international footballers
Serie B players
Catania S.S.D. players
A.S. Sambenedettese players
A.S.D. Sangiovannese 1927 players
Expatriate footballers in Italy
Democratic Republic of the Congo expatriate sportspeople in Italy
Association football forwards
21st-century Democratic Republic of the Congo people